Peter Christopher Tully (born March 31, 1982), is an American Democratic Party politician who has represented the 38th Legislative District in the New Jersey Assembly since 2018. For the 2022-23 legislative session he serves as the Deputy Majority Leader.

Raised in Bergenfield, Tully graduated from Bergenfield High School and Northeastern University.

Political career
Tully served on the Borough of Bergenfield council for eight years (2009 to 2017), and was Council President in 2011 and 2014. Tully also previously served as an aide to U.S. Representative Josh Gottheimer.

New Jersey General Assembly
Tully and Lisa Swain were appointed to the New Jersey General Assembly's 38th District seats after Assemblymen Joseph Lagana and Tim Eustace both resigned from their seats to move on to other positions. Tully won the special election to serve the rest of his term on November 6, 2018.

In 2020, he was one of the co-sponsors of Assembly Bill 4454 (now N.J.S.A. 18A:35-4.36a) which requires that a curriculum on diversity and inclusion be part of the school curriculum for students in kindergarten through twelfth grade.

Committee assignments 
Committee assignments for the 2022—23 Legislative Session session are:
Science, Innovation and Technology, Chair
Aging and Senior Services, Vice-Chair
Health

District 38 
Each of the 40 districts in the New Jersey Legislature has one representative in the New Jersey Senate and two members in the New Jersey General Assembly. The representatives from the 38th District for the 2022—23 Legislative Session are:
 Senator Joseph Lagana  (D)
 Assemblywoman Lisa Swain  (D)
 Assemblyman Chris Tully  (D)

References

External links
Legislative webpage

1982 births
Living people
Bergenfield High School alumni
Democratic Party members of the New Jersey General Assembly
New Jersey city council members
Northeastern University alumni
21st-century American politicians
People from Bergenfield, New Jersey
Politicians from Bergen County, New Jersey